Warley may refer to:

Places in the United Kingdom

Essex
Warley, Essex
Great Warley
Little Warley
Warley Hospital

West Midlands
Warley, West Midlands, a neighbourhood centred on the towns of Oldbury and Smethwick
Warley (UK Parliament constituency), current
County Borough of Warley, a former local authority 
Warley High School, a former comprehensive school

West Yorkshire
Warley Town

Ships
HMS Calcutta, the East Indiaman Warley, built in 1788 and sold to the Royal Navy in 1795
Warley (1796 ship), an East Indiaman, launched in 1795, participated in Nathaniel Dance's victory at the Battle of Pulo Aura

People
Warley (footballer, born 1978), full name Warley Silva dos Santos, Brazilian football forward
Warley Oliveira (born 1989), Brazilian football forward
Warley (footballer, born 1999), full name Warley Leandro da Silva, Brazilian football wing-back

See also
Warleigh
Warley East (UK Parliament constituency), former
Warley West (UK Parliament constituency), former